The Cologne Wailing Wall  was created at the end of 1980 by Walter Herrmann in the Schildergasse in Cologne, Western Germany.

Overview
Messages denouncing the living conditions of Palestinian people were written on small cardboard pieces and suspended on clotheslines. The "Wailing Wall" was erected in 1991 in front of the south tower of the Cologne Cathedral, supported by a vigil against the Second Gulf War. The authorities attempted to stop the project multiple times, using lawsuits, confiscations and evictions.

Until 1997, 50,000 supporters used this form of open communication to post their messages of solidarity, calls for social justice or letters of support on cardboard.

The  "Wailing Wall" was reactivated in 2004 by Walter Herrmann. The project was criticized and accused of one-sidedness and antisemitism.

References

External links 

Culture in Cologne
Anti-imperialism in Europe